Turkey competed at the 1972 Summer Olympics in Munich, West Germany. 43 competitors, 42 men and 1 woman, took part in 43 events in 8 sports.

Medalists

Athletics

Men's 800 metres
Mehmet Tümkan
 Heat — 1:49.5 (→ did not advance)

Men's 1500 metres
Mehmet Tümkan
 Heat — 3:44.0 (→ did not advance)

Men's 5000 metres
Hikmet Şen
 Heat — 14:26.0 (→ did not advance)

Boxing

Men's Light Flyweight (– 48 kg)
Arif Doğru 
 First Round — Lost to Davey Armstrong (USA), 1:4

Men's Flyweight (– 51 kg)
 Kemal Sonunur
 First Round — Bye 
 Second Round — Lost to Constantin Gruescu (ROM), 0:5

Men's Bantamweight (– 54 kg)
 Mehmet Kumova 
 First Round — Lost to Mayaki Seydou (NIG), 2:3

Cycling

Six cyclists represented Turkey in 1972.

Individual road race
 Ali Hüryılmaz — 73rd place 
 Mevlüt Boradid not finish (→ no ranking)
 Rıfat Çalışkan — did not finish (→ no ranking)
 Haluk Günözgen — did not finish (→ no ranking)

Team time trial
 Mevlüt Bora
 Erol Küçükbakırcı
 Ali Hüryılmaz
 Seyit Kırmızı

Fencing

Four fencers, three men and one woman, represented Turkey in 1972.

Men's foil
 Bülent Erdem

Men's épée
 Ali Tayla

Men's sabre
 Mehmet Akpınar

Women's foil
 Özden Ezinler

Shooting

Four male shooters represented Turkey in 1972.

50 m rifle, three positions
 Mehmet Dursun

50 m rifle, prone
 Mehmet Dursun

Trap
 Fettah Güney

Skeet
 Özman Gıraud
 Güneş Yunus

Swimming

Men's 100m Freestyle
Feridun Aybars
 Heat — 59.32s (→  did not advance)

Weightlifting

Wrestling

References

External links
Official Olympic Reports
International Olympic Committee results database

Nations at the 1972 Summer Olympics
1972 Summer Olympics
1972 in Turkish sport